"Radio Blast" is a song by Chicago-based pop punk band Screeching Weasel. The band lineup for this single is the same as on their 1993 album, Wiggle.  2000 copies were initially pressed on Underdog Records.  A later repress came out on burgundy colored vinyl and had a sticker on the sleeve that proclaimed it "not part of the limited edition".  Both pressings are now out of print, but the two songs from this release can be found on the B-sides and rarities collection, Kill the Musicians.  The A-side is a vicious attack on the state of rock radio.  Side B is the sad story of a girl who cannot find love and ends up committing suicide.  "The Girl Next Door" was covered by Blink-182, which was first released on a 1998 reissue of their first demo album, Buddha.

Track listing
 "Radio Blast" (Weasel/Vapid)
 "The Girl Next Door" (Weasel)

Personnel
Ben Weasel - vocals
Jughead - guitar
Danny Vapid - guitar, backing vocals
Johnny Personality - bass
Dan Panic - drums

References

1993 singles
Screeching Weasel songs
1993 songs

Influence
Radio Blast is also a band from New York City that takes its name from the Screeching Weasel song.